Marita is a genus of sea snails, marine gastropod mollusks in the family Mangeliidae.

Description
Originally considered a subgenus of Guraleus, it was separated by Charles Henley in 1922 because of these special characteristics: rounded shoulder, ovate contour, shorter spire, and a smoother sculpture.

Distribution
This marine genus is endemic to Australia and occurs off New South Wales, South Australia, Tasmania, Victoria and Western Australia

Species
Species within the genus Marita include according to the World Register of Marine Species (WoRMS) 
 Marita compta (Adams & Angas, 1864)
 Marita elongata Laseron, 1954
 Marita inornata (Sowerby III, 1896)
 Marita insculpta (Adams & Angas, 1864)
 Marita nitida (Hedley, 1922)
 Marita schoutenensis (May, 1901)
 Marita tumida Laseron, 1954
Species brought into synonymy
 Marita bella (Adams & Angas, 1864): synonym of Antiguraleus adcocki (G. B. Sowerby III, 1896)
 Marita peregrina A.A. Gould, 1860: synonym of Marita compta (Adams & Angas, 1864)
 Marita varix J.E. Tenison-Woods, 1877: synonym of Marita compta (Adams & Angas, 1864)

References

External links

  Bouchet P., Kantor Yu.I., Sysoev A. & Puillandre N. (2011) A new operational classification of the Conoidea. Journal of Molluscan Studies 77: 273-308.
  Tucker, J.K. 2004 Catalog of recent and fossil turrids (Mollusca: Gastropoda). Zootaxa 682:1-1295.
 Worldwide Mollusk Data base : Mangeliidae

 
Gastropods of Australia